The Dutch National Track Championships – Women's individual pursuit is the Dutch national championship individual pursuit event held annually at the Dutch National Track Championships.

Medalists

Results from cyclebase.nl and cyclingarchives.com.

Multiple champions
12 times champion: Keetie van Oosten-Hage
8 times champion: Leontien Van Moorsel
4 times champion: Ellen van Dijk
3 times champion: Petra De Bruin, Maria Jongeling, Adrie Visser and Kirsten Wild

References

 
Dutch National track cycling championships
Women's individual pursuit